Twenty One Pilots is an American musical duo from Columbus, Ohio, consisting of frontman Tyler Joseph and bandmate Josh Dun. The band has received 40 awards from a total of 134 nominations.

Alternative Press Music Awards

|-
| rowspan="4" | 2014
| Vessel
| Album of the Year 
|  
|-
| rowspan="2" | Twenty One Pilots
| Breakthrough Band 
| 
|-
| Best Live Band 
|  
|-
| Josh Dun
| Best Drummer  
|  
|-
| rowspan="3" | 2015
| rowspan="4" | Twenty One Pilots
| Best Live Band
|  
|-
| Most Dedicated Fans 
|  
|-
| Tumblr Fandom of the Year 
| 
|-
| rowspan="3" | 2016
| Artist of the Year  
| 
|-
| Blurryface
| Album of the Year 
| 
|-
| "Stressed Out"
| Best Music Video 
| 
|-
| rowspan="1" | 2017
| Twenty One Pilots
| Most Dedicated Fans 
|  
|-
|}

American Music Awards

|-
|rowspan="2" | 2016
|rowspan="4" | Twenty One Pilots
| Favorite Duo or Group – Pop/Rock
| 
|-
|rowspan="3" | Favorite Artist – Alternative Rock
| 
|-
| rowspan="1" | 2017
| 
|-
| 2020
| 
|}

ARIA Music Awards

|-
|2016
| Twenty One Pilots
| Best International Artist
| 
|}

BBC Radio 1

|-
|2018
| Jumpsuit
| Hottest Record of the Year
| 
|}

Billboard Awards

Billboard Music Awards

|-
| rowspan="4"| 2016
| rowspan="2"| Twenty One Pilots
| Top Duo/Group
| 
|-
| Top Rock Artist
| 
|-
| Blurryface
| Top Rock Album
| 
|-
| "Stressed Out"
| Top Rock Song
| 
|-
| rowspan="17"| 2017
|rowspan="9" | Twenty One Pilots
| Top Artist
| 
|-
| Billboard Chart Achievement
| 
|-
| Top Duo/Group
| 
|-
| Top Billboard 200 Artist
| 
|-
| Top Hot 100 Artist
| 
|-
| Top Song Sales Artist
| 
|-
| Top Radio Songs Artist
| 
|-
| Top Streaming Artist
| 
|-
| Top Rock Artist
| 
|-
| rowspan="2"| Blurryface
| Top Billboard 200 Album
| 
|-
| Top Rock Album
| 
|-
| rowspan="4"| "Heathens"
| Top Hot 100 Song
| 
|-
| Top Selling Song
| 
|-
| Top Streaming Song (Video)
| 
|-
| rowspan="3"| Top Rock Song
| 
|-
| "Stressed Out"
| 
|-
| "Ride"
| 
|-
| rowspan="2"| 2019
| Twenty One Pilots
| Top Rock Artist
| 
|-
| Trench
| Top Rock Album
| 
|-
| rowspan="3"| 2020
| "Chlorine"
| rowspan="2"| Top Rock Song
| 
|-
| "The Hype"
| 
|-
| rowspan="3"| Twenty One Pilots
| rowspan="3"| Top Rock Artist
| 
|-
| 2021
| 
|- 
| rowspan="2"|2022
| 
|-
| “Scaled and Icy”
| Top Rock Album
| 
|}

Billboard Touring Awards

|-
| 2016
| Twenty One Pilots
| Breakthrough Artist
| 
|-
|}

BMI Awards

|-
| rowspan="2"| 2017 
| rowspan="2"| Award Winning Songs
| "Ride"
| 
|-
| "Stressed Out"
| 
|-
| rowspan="2" | 2021 
| Songwriters & Publishers of the Most-Performed Songs of the Year
| "Level of Concern"
| 
|-
|}

Brit Awards

|-
| 2017
|rowspan="2" | Twenty One Pilots
|rowspan="2" | International Group
| 
|-
| 2019
| 
|}

Echo Awards

|-
| rowspan="2"|2017
| rowspan="2" | Twenty One Pilots
| Best International Newcomer
| 
|-
| Best International Rock/Pop Group
|  
|}

GAFFA Awards

GAFFA Awards (Denmark)
Delivered since 1991, the GAFFA Awards are a Danish award that rewards popular music by the magazine of the same name.

!
|-
| 2016
| Twenty One Pilots
| Best Foreign New Act
| 
| style="text-align:center;" |
|-
|}

Grammy Awards

Note: "Heathens" was nominated for Best Rock Song and Best Song Written for Visual Media in 2017, which are only presented to the songwriter of the song, Tyler Joseph.

Note: "Jumpsuit" was nominated for Best Rock Song in 2019 which are only presented to the songwriter of the song, Tyler Joseph.

Guild of Music Supervisors Awards

|-
|-
| 2017
| "Heathens" for Suicide Squad
| Best Song/Recording Created for a Film 
| 
|-
|}

iHeartRadio Music Awards

|-
|-
| rowspan="2" | 2016
| Twenty One Pilots 
| Alternative Rock Artist of the Year 
|  
|-
| rowspan="2" | "Stressed Out" 
| Alternative Rock Song of the Year 
|  
|-
| rowspan=10| 2017
| Song of the Year
|
|-
| rowspan=3| Twenty One Pilots
| Best Duo/Group of the Year
|
|-
| Alternative Rock Artist of the Year
|
|-
| Best Fan Army
|
|-
| "Ride"
| rowspan=2| Alternative Rock Song of the Year
|
|-
| rowspan="4"|"Heathens"
|
|-
| Best Song from a Movie
|
|-
| Best Lyrics
|
|-
| Best Music Video
|
|-
| rowspan="1"| Blurryface
| Alternative Rock Album of the Year
|
|-
| rowspan="2"|
2019
| Twenty One Pilots
| Duo/Group of the Year
|
|-
| Trench
| Best Rock Album of the Year
|
|-
| rowspan="2"| 2020
| "The Hype"
| Alternative Rock Song of the Year
| 
|-
| rowspan="3"| Twenty One Pilots
| Alternative Rock Artist of the Year
| 
|-
| rowspan="3"| 2021
| Best Duo/Group of the Year
| 
|-
| Alternative Rock Artist of the Year
| 
|-
| "Level of Concern"
| Alternative Rock Song of the Year
| 
|-
| rowspan="3"| 2022
|-
| Twenty One Pilots
| Alternative Rock Artist of the Year
| 
|-
| "Shy Away"
| Alternative Rock Song of the Year
| 
|-
| rowspan="3"| 2023
| Twenty One Pilots
| Alternative Rock Artist of the Year
| 
|-
|}

Kerrang! Awards

|-
| rowspan="2"|2016
| rowspan="3" |Twenty One Pilots
| Best Live Band
| 
|-
| Best Fanbase 
| 
|-
| rowspan="2"|2022 
| Best Live Act
| 
|}

LOS40 Music Awards

|-
| 2016
| Twenty One Pilots
| International New Act of the Year
| 
|}

MTV Awards

MTV Europe Music Awards

|-
| 2011
| rowspan="11" |Twenty One Pilots
|rowspan="2" | Best Push Act 
| 
|-
| 2013
| 
|-
| 2015
|rowspan="2" | Best Alternative
| 
|-
| rowspan="3" | 2016 
| 
|-
| Best Live Act 
| 
|-
| Best US Act 
| 
|-
| 2018
| rowspan="2" | Best Alternative
| 
|-
| rowspan="2" | 2019
| 
|-
| Best World Stage
| 
|-
| 2020
| rowspan="2" | Best Alternative
| 
|-
| 2021
| 
|-
| rowspan="2" | 2022
| Twenty One Pilots Concert Experience (Roblox)
| Best Metaverse Performance
| 
|-
| Twenty One Pilots
| Best Alternative
| 
|}

MTV Fandom Awards

|-
| 2016
| Twenty One Pilots
| Fandom of the Year
| 
|}

MTV Italian Music Awards

|-
| 2017
| Twenty One Pilots
| Best International Band
| 
|}

MTV Millennial Awards

|-
| 2017
| "Heathens"
| International Hit of the Year
| 
|}

MTV Video Music Awards

|-
| 2013
| "Holding on to You" 
| Artist to Watch 
| 
|-
| 2016
| "Heathens" 
| rowspan="3"| Best Rock Video 
| 
|-
| 2017
| "Heavydirtysoul" 
| 
|-
| 2019
| "My Blood"
| 
|-
| rowspan="3" | 2020
| Twenty One Pilots
| Best Group
| 
|-
| rowspan="2" | "Level of Concern"
| Best Music Video From Home
| 
|-
| rowspan="2" | Best Alternative
| 
|-
| rowspan="2" | 2021
| "Shy Away"
| 
|-
| Twenty One Pilots
| Group of the Year
| 
|-
| rowspan="2" | 2022
| "Saturday"
| Best Alternative
| 
|-
| Twenty One Pilots Concert Experience (Roblox)
| Best Metaverse Performance
| 
|}

mtvU Woodie Awards

|-
| 2013
|rowspan="2" | Twenty One Pilots
| Breaking Woodie
| 
|-
| 2017
| Woodie of the Year
| 
|}

Much Music Video Awards

|-
|-
| rowspan="1" | 2016
|rowspan="2" | Twenty One Pilots
|rowspan="2" | International Duo or Group
| 
|-
| rowspan="1" | 2017
| 
|}

Nickelodeon Kids' Choice Awards

|-
| rowspan="4" | 2017
| rowspan="2"| Twenty One Pilots
| Favorite New Artist
| 
|-
| Favorite Music Group
| 
|-
| "Heathens" 
| Favorite Song
| 
|-
| "Stressed Out"
| Favorite Music Video
| 
|-
| rowspan="1" | 2018
| Twenty One Pilots
| Favorite Music Group
| 
|-
| rowspan="1" | 2019
| Twenty One Pilots
| Favorite Music Group
| 
|}

NME Awards

|-
|2017
|Twenty One Pilots
|Worst Band
|  
|}

NRJ Music Awards

|-
|2016
|Twenty One Pilots
|International Revelation of the Year 
|  
|}

People's Choice Awards

|-
| 2017
| rowspan="4"| Twenty One Pilots
| rowspan="4"| Group of the Year
| 
|-
| 2018
| 
|-
| 2020
| 
|-
| 2021
| 
|}

Radio Disney Music Awards

|-
|2017
|Twenty One Pilots
|Best Group
|
|}

Rock Sound Awards

|-
| 2018
| Trench
| Album of the Year
| 
|}

Teen Choice Awards

|-
| 2015
| "Tear in My Heart" 
|rowspan="2" | Choice Rock Song 
|  
|-
| rowspan="2"| 2016
| rowspan="2"|"Stressed Out"
| 
|-
| Choice Song Group
| 
|-
| rowspan="4"| 2017 
| rowspan="2"| "Heathens"
| Choice Song Group
| 
|-
| Choice Rock/Alternative Song
| 
|-
| rowspan="4" | Twenty One Pilots
| Choice Music Group 
| 
|-
|rowspan="3" | Choice Rock Group 
| 
|-
| 2018
|  
|-
| 2019
| 
|}

Telehit Awards

|-
|2016
|rowspan="2" | Twenty One Pilots
|rowspan="2" | Best Rock Band
|
|-
|2017
|
|}

ZD Awards 
 Zvukovaya Dorozhka  ("soundtrack") is Russia's oldest hit parade in the field of popular music. Since 2003 it is presented in a ceremony in concert halls. It's considered one of the major Russian music awards.

!
|-
| 2018
| Twenty One Pilots
| Best Foreign Act
| 
| style="text-align:center;" |
|-
|}

References

Twenty One Pilots
Awards